The Politics of Liberia takes place in a framework of a presidential representative democratic republic modeled on the government of the United States, whereby the President is the head of state and head of government; unlike the United States, however, Liberia is a unitary state as opposed to a federation and has a pluriform  rather than the two-party system that characterizes US politics. Executive power is exercised by the government. Legislative power is vested in both the government and the two chambers of the legislature.

Liberia is still in transition from dictatorship and civil war to democracy. Liberia's government is based on the American model of a republic with three equal branches of government, though in reality, the President of Liberia has usually been the dominant force in Liberian politics. Following the dissolution of the Republican Party in 1876, the True Whig Party dominated the Liberian government until the 1980 coup, eventually creating what was effectively a stable, one-party state, with little politics in the usual sense. The longest-serving president in Liberian history was William Tubman, serving from 1944 until his death in 1971. The shortest term was held by James Skivring Smith, who was interim president for all of two months in 1871. However, the political process from Liberia's founding in 1847, despite widespread corruption, was very stable until the end of the First Republic in 1980.

This situation changed abruptly in 1980, with the revolt against the Americo-Liberians and their True Whig Party. Currently, no party has majority control of the legislature.

Political developments since 1980

Between 1980 and 2006, Liberia was governed by a series of military and transitional governments. The president of the last of these, Charles Taylor, was forced to step down in 2003, and the United Nations installed a transitional government. Elections to select a government to replace the transitional government took place in October and November 2005. (see 2005 Liberian general election).

In the 1980s, Samuel K. Doe's government increasingly adopted an ethnic outlook as members of his Krahn ethnic group soon dominated political and military life in Liberia. This caused a heightened level of ethnic tension leading to frequent hostilities between the politically and militarily dominant Krahns and other ethnic groups in the country.

Political parties remained banned until 1984. Elections were held on 15 October 1985 in which Doe's National Democratic Party of Liberia (NDPL) was declared the winner. The elections were characterized by widespread fraud and rigging. The period after the elections saw increased human rights abuses, corruption, and ethnic tensions. The standard of living, which had been rising in the 1970s, declined drastically.

On 12 November 1985, former Army Commanding General Thomas Quiwonkpa invaded Liberia by way of neighboring Sierra Leone and almost succeeded in toppling the government of Samuel Doe. Members of the Krahn-dominated Armed Forces of Liberia repelled Quiwonkpa's attack and executed him in Monrovia.

On 24 December 1989, a small band of rebels led by Doe's former procurement chief, Charles Taylor invaded Liberia from Ivory Coast. Taylor and his National Patriotic Front rebels rapidly gained the support of Liberians because of the repressive nature of Samuel Doe and his government. Barely six months after the rebels first attacked, they had reached the outskirts of Monrovia.

The First and Second Liberian Civil War, which was one of Africa's bloodiest, claimed the lives of more than 200,000 Liberians and further displaced a million others into refugee camps in neighboring countries.

The Economic Community of West African States (ECOWAS) intervened and succeeded in preventing Charles Taylor from capturing Monrovia. Prince Johnson who had been a member of Taylor's National Patriotic Front of Liberia (NPFL) but broke away because of policy differences, formed the Independent National Patriotic Front of Liberia (INPFL). Johnson's forces captured and killed Doe on 9 September 1990.

An Interim Government of National Unity (IGNU) was formed in Gambia under the auspices of ECOWAS in October 1990 and Dr. Amos Sawyer became President. Taylor refused to work with the interim government and continued war.

By 1992, several warring factions had emerged in the Liberian civil war, all of which were absorbed in the new transitional government. After several peace accords and declining military power, Taylor finally agreed to the formation of a five-man transitional government.

After considerable progress in negotiations conducted by the United States, United Nations, Organization of African Unity, and the Economic Community of West African States, disarmament and demobilization of warring factions were hastily carried out and special elections were held on 19 July 1997 with Charles Taylor and his National Patriotic Party emerging victorious. Taylor won the election by a large majority, primarily because Liberians feared a return to war had Taylor lost.

Unrest continued, and by 2003, two rebel groups were challenging Taylor's control of the country. In August 2003, Taylor resigned and fled the country and vice-president Moses Blah became acting president. On 18 August 2003, the warring parties signed the Accra Comprehensive Peace Agreement which marked the political end of the conflict.

The international community again intervened and helped set up a transitional government (National Transitional Government of Liberia) which was led by Gyude Bryant until the Liberian general election of 2005.

For more than a year, over 9,000 census-takers combed the densely forested nation mapping every structure. For three days starting 21 March 2008, they revisited each dwelling and counted the inhabitants.

Executive branch

|President
|George Weah
|Congress for Democratic Change
|22 January 2018
|-
|Vice President
|Jewel Taylor
|Congress for Democratic Change
|22 January 2018
|}
The president is elected by popular vote for a six-year term (renewable). The cabinet is appointed by the president and confirmed by the Senate.

Legislative branch

Liberia has a bicameral Legislature that consists of the Senate (30 seats; members elected by popular vote to serve nine-year terms) and the House of Representatives (73 seats; members elected by popular vote to serve six-year terms)

Political parties and elections

Presidential elections

House of Representatives elections

Senate elections

Judicial branch
There is a Supreme Court, criminal courts, and appeals court and magistrate courts in the counties. There also are traditional courts and lay courts in the counties. Trial by ordeal is practiced in various parts of Liberia.

Administrative divisions

The basic unit of local government is the town chief. There are clan chiefs, paramount chiefs, and district commissioners. The counties are governed by superintendents appointed by the President. There are fifteen counties in Liberia.

International organization participation
ACP, 
AfDB, 
CCC, 
ECA, 
ECOWAS, 
FAO, 
G-77, 
IAEA, 
IBRD, 
ICAO, 
ICFTU, 
ICRM, 
IDA, 
IFAD, 
IFC, 
IFRCS, 
ILO, 
IMF, 
IMO, 
Inmarsat, 
Intelsat (nonsignatory user), 
Interpol, 
IOC, 
IOM, 
ITU, 
NAM, 
OAU, 
OPCW, 
UN, 
UNCTAD, 
UNESCO, 
UNIDO, 
UPU, 
WCL, 
WFTU, 
WHO, 
WIPO, 
WMO

See also 
 List of government ministries of Liberia

References

Further reading
Clower, Robert W. "Growth without development. An economic survey of Liberia." (1966).
Ellis, Stephen. The Mask of Anarchy updated edition: The destruction of Liberia and the religious dimension of an African civil war. NYU Press, 2007.
Fraenkel, Merran. Tribe and class in Monrovia. publ. for the International African Institute by the Oxford Univ. Press, 1970. 
Gifford, Paul. Christianity and politics in Doe's Liberia. Vol. 2. Cambridge University Press, 2002.
SS Hlophe, Class, ethnicity and politics in Liberia: a class analysis of power struggles in the Tubman and Tolbert administrations from 1944-1975 - 1979 - University Press of America
International Crisis Group, Liberia reports
Levitt, Jeremy Isaac. "The evolution of deadly conflict in Liberia: From paternaltarianism to state collapse." PhD diss., University of Cambridge, 2002. Book form 2005.
Martin Lowenkopf, Politics in Liberia: The Conservative Road to Development, 1976.
Amos Sawyer, The emergence of autocracy in Liberia: Tragedy and challenge. ICS Press, 1992.
Amos Sawyer, Effective immediately, dictatorship in Liberia, 1980-1986: a personal perspective. No. 5. Liberia Working Group, 1987.
Amos Sawyer, Beyond Plunder: Toward Democratic Governance in Liberia
William Reno, Reinvention of an African Patrimonial State: Charles Taylor's Liberia, Third World Quarterly, Vol. 16, No. 1 (Mar. 1995), pp. 109–120 Published by Taylor & Francis, Ltd.

External links

http://www.traveldocs.com/lr/history.htm